Greene Township is the name of three townships in the U.S. state of Indiana:

 Greene Township, Jay County, Indiana
 Greene Township, Parke County, Indiana
 Greene Township, St. Joseph County, Indiana

See also:
 Green Township, Indiana (disambiguation)
 Greene Township (disambiguation)

Indiana township disambiguation pages